Kidapawan, officially the City of Kidapawan (Maguindanaon: Kuta nu Kidapawan, Jawi: كوتا نو كيدڤاوان; Obo Monuvu: Ingod to Kidapawan), is a 3rd class component city and capital of the province of Cotabato, Philippines. According to the 2020 Census, it has a population of 160,791 people.

It is located at the foot of Mount Apo, it is a popular destination from late October to December and in the summer, when thousands of tourists climb the country's highest mountain.

Etymology 

Many proposed etymologies have been recorded to explain the origin of Kidapawan's name over the decades. In 2017, Karlo Antonio Galay David gathered all written and oral explanations from archival sources and tribal key informants. Galay David gathered thirteen proposed etymologies, and of these thirteen, six are about springs, three are about weddings, three are about highlands, two are names, and three are directional and imply the act of going. 
The etymologies are listed as follows:

History
The Greater Kidapawan Area was originally a vast area that covered much of the north-eastern part of North Cotabato. When it was created a municipality, Kidapawan extended from the Pulangi River in Kabacan to the west, The Matanao River bordering Davao to the east, Bukidnon province to the north, and Buluan to the south.

Kidapawan has its roots in pre-colonial settlements of the Obo Monuvu, the indigenous peoples that have lived at the foot of Mt Apo on both the Cotabato and Davao sides for generations. The Monuvu, along with other tribes in the area with whom they frequently intermarried, remained independent throughout the Spanish colonial period, as the Spaniards were never able to surmount Mt Apo on the Davao side nor penetrate beyond the Ligawasan Marsh on the Cotabato side.  The chieftains of the tribes in the Greater Kidapawan Area remained independent but maintained relations with the nearby Maguindanaon sultanates, the closest of which were the Sultanate of Buayan in Dulawan (today Datu Piang, Maguindanao), and its related settlement, the Sultanate of Bagua Inged in what is today Pikit and Pagalungan. The Monuvu settlements, the precursors of many of Kidapawan's modern day Baranggays, existed autonomously with one another but were ruled by chieftains often related by centuries of intermarriage.

Some time before the coming of the Americans, the different tribal settlements west of the Matanao river apparently fell under the influence of a Datu Ingkal (in some sources he is named Datu Ingkal Ugok), who became paramount chieftain over the different settlements within the Kidapawan area. When the Americans came they recognized Datu Ingkal's leadership, and records say he was appointed ‘Capitan’ by a Col. Stevens in 1908, presumably as head of a tribal ward under what was then the Cotabato District of the Moro Province

When Datu Ampatuan of Maganoy threatened to stage a rebellion against the Americans in 1913, Datu Ingkal is recorded as threatening to side with him. The Americans sought to pacify the two datus by offering appointments and administrative arrangements.
 
Datu Ingkal's territory, Kidapawan, would be formed into a Municipal District on July 23, 1914, one of twenty seven under the newly created Cotabato Province of the Department of Mindanao and Sulu as mandated under Article 19 of Act No. 2408. Datu Siawan Ingkal, son of Datu Ingkal Ugok, would be appointed Municipal District President. The act was made official with Act No. 2711 approved on March 10, 1917, mentioning Kidapawan as a municipal district. The Cornejo Commonwealth Directory of 1939, published under the newly elected Quezon government, still names Datu Siawan as District President, with Datu Amag Madut as vice president.

Kidapawan's establishment as a Municipal District paved the way for settlers from Luzon and Visayas to come over the succeeding decades up until the 1960s. Kidapawan was not a planned colony, but it was surrounded by planned colonies on both sides, thus encouraging individual migration: Davao, a Spanish colony in the late 1800s, Pikit, an agricultural colony set up by the Americans, the settlements of the National Land Settlement Administration (NLSA) in what is today South Cotabato, and much later the colony of Alamada under Magsaysay's National Resettlement and Rehabilitation Administration (NARRA). The diverse ethnic composition of Kidapawan's settler population, with Cebuanos, Tagalogs, Ilonggos, Chinese, and Igorots, reflect both the gradual individual efforts of migrants and Kidapawan's position as the transition area between Cebuano-dominated Davao and Ilonggo-dominated Cotabato.

There are conflicting accounts as to where the original center of Kidapawan was before the War. Tribal and settler sources name either Manongol (for a time called ‘Old Kidapawan’) or Lanao as centers, with some sources identifying Lanao as the commercial center of the town where the settlers concentrated, with Manongol the seat of Siawan Ingkal's chieftaincy.

The details of Kidapawan's arrangements during the Second World War are unclear, but it seems to have been one of the Municipal Districts elevated in 1942 to Municipality by virtue of Executive Order No. 43 of the Japanese-sponsored Executive Commission.

No records attest to it, but informants (primary among them Rosita Blanco Cadungog) names Filomeno Blanco as the local appointed Mayor by the Japanese during their occupation of Kidapawan. There are even less details on the arrangements of the resistance government, but Kidapawan fell under the command of Datu Udtog Matalam, who with his Bolo Batallion led the Cotabato region's guerrilla movement. Records indicate that in 1942 Alfonso O. Angeles Sr. had been appointed ‘Mayor of the Upper Cotabato Sector,’ to which Kidapawan presumably belonged, while the Paclibar family describes a ‘Civil Emergency Administration’ in M’lang under the 118th Infantry Regiment of the 106th Division of Wendell Fertig's 10th Military District (the resistance detachment in Mindanao during the War), headed by Jacinto Paclibar.

When the War ended, Kidapawan's administrative status was in limbo, but in all likelihood it was reverted to Municipal District. No documents also confirm it, but informants like Erlinda Villanueva Asuelo name Ceferino J. Villanueva as acting mayor after the War up to the election of 1947.

In 1947 Kidapawan was among the ten municipalities created by Executive Order No. 82, signed on August 18, 1947, by Manuel A. Roxas. The newly created Municipality ‘consist of the territory comprised in the municipal districts of Kidapawan together with the unexplored region north of this municipal district to the boundary of Davao province on the east and Bukidnon province on the north, and Pulangi River on the west, and M’lang which is at present a part of the municipal district of Buluan.’

The election of 1947 resulted in the victory of Alfonso O. Angeles Sr. The first elected Vice Mayor was Datu Siawan Ingkal, while the first elected Councilors were Gil dela Cruz, Lorenzo A. Saniel, Lino Madrid, Ricardo Ipong, Norberto Cajucom, and Arsenio Sibug. The first Municipal Government began functioning in 1948.

The vast area of the original municipality of Kidapawan was partitioned bit by bit over the next two decades, with the municipality of M'lang first separating in 1951, followed by the municipality of Makilala in 1954, the municipality of Matalam in 1961, the municipality of Magpet in 1963, and the municipality of President Roxas in 1967.

Kidapawan's historical territory is now composed of eight towns in the province: Kidapawan itself, M’lang, Makilala, parts of Matalam, Magpet, President Roxas, Antipas, Tulunan and Arakan, along with the portion of Bansalan east of the Matanao River. 
When the second partitioning of the Empire Province of Cotabato happened in the 1970s, Kidapawan became the provincial capital of the much-reduced Cotabato Province (now colloquially called North Cotabato) by virtue of Presidential Decree No. 341, issued by Ferdinand Marcos on November 22, 1973.

Cityhood

As early as 1951 Kidapawan's successive governments had made attempts to become a city, but it was not until 1998 that it finally achieved this. Republic Act 8500, authored by then North Cotabato Second District Representative Gregorio Andolana, was signed by Fidel V. Ramos on February 12, 1998. The last Municipal mayor, Luis P. Malaluan, was elected Kidapawan's first city mayor.

Geography

Kidapawan is located at the foot of Mount Apo in the south-eastern section of Cotabato province, placed in the middle of other major cities of General Santos, Davao City, Cotabato City and Cagayan de Oro. It borders the other towns of Cotabato province, namely: Magpet and President Roxas to the north, Matalam to the west, M’lang to the south and Makilala to the east.

Much of its land area was mostly flat, except for the increasingly hilly and mountainous areas to the northeast near Mount Apo which is the highest point in the Philippines. The Kabacan River has its source in the northeastern part of the city and flows through across its northern border with Magpet town.

Barangays
The city of Kidapawan is politically subdivided into 40 barangays.

Climate

Kidapawan lies outside the typhoon belt and has a mild climate characterized by wet and dry seasons. The coldest months are December and January.  The hottest are April and May.

Demographics

In the 2015 census, the city had a total population of 140,195 people, up from 125,447 people in 2010 and 117,610 from in 2007. The religion is predominantly Christian, although there are many Muslims residing in the city as well. The main languages are Cebuano and Hiligaynon, while English functions as a secondary language. Other languages spoken include Obo Monuvu (the city's indigenous language) Maguindanaon, Meranaw, Ilianen, and Tagabawa.

Obo Monuvu, Cebuanos and Hiligaynons are the major ethnic groups in the city. Other ethnic groups residing in the area are the Ilocanos, Maguindanaons and Manobo groups of Obo, Ilianen, and Tagabawa. Cebuano is the most widely spoken language, especially in the city proper. English is used as the medium of instruction in schools and other learning institutions; it is also predominantly used in major government agencies in their transactions and reports. Laws and ordinances in the city are all written in English.

Government

The city of Kidapawan is governed by the city mayor, the city's local chief executive and administrative officer, along with the city vice mayor. The Sangguniang Panlungsod serves as the local legislative body of the city. Kidapawan is also the seat of the provincial government of the province of Cotabato, with the provincial capitol being located at Barangay Amas in the western portion of the city.

List of former chief executives
American appointed ‘Capitan’ of Kidapawan 
 Datu Ingkal Ugok  ( 1908 - ?)

Appointed President of the Municipal District of Kidapawan
 Datu Siawan Ingkal (1914 - ? )

Civilian heads during and after the Second World War

 Datu Siawan Ingkal (1942- ?) (as sitting Municipal District President)
 Filomeno Blanco (1942-?) (appointed by the Imperial Japanese Army)
 Jacinto Paclibar (1942-?) (as head of Civil Service Administration in M'lang)
 Ceferino Villanueva (1947) (Postwar Mayor appointed in OIC capacity by Udtog Matalam)

Elected and appointed mayors of the Municipality and City of Kidapawan

 Alfonso O. Angeles Sr. (1948 – 1955) (1964-1967)
 Dr. Gil F. Gadi (1956 – resigned 1957)
 Lorenzo A. Saniel (Vice Mayor, assumed 1957 – 1959)
 Dr. Alberto F. Madriguera (1960 – 1962, removed by electoral protest)
 Dr. Emma B. Gadi (won electoral protest in 1963) (1968-1971)
 Atty. Juan G. Sibug (Vice Mayor, assumed September – December 1967)
 Augusto R. Gana (1972 - 1986) (1988-1992)
 Florante L. Respicio (1986 – 1988, Appointed OIC by Corazon Aquino Government)
 Domingo B. Landicho (December 1988, Appointed OIC when Respicio resigned)
 Joseph A. Evangelista (1992-1994) (2013–2022)
 Dr. Luis P. Malaluan (1994 – 2004)
 Rodolfo Y. Gantuangco (2004 – 2013)
 Atty Jose Paolo M. Evangelista (2022-2024)

Economy

The city is considered as the province's industrial hub, and plays a pivotal role in the economic development of the province and its adjacent areas. It is the commercial and trading hub of eastern Cotabato province as it lies at the heart of three large domestic markets of Davao City, General Santos, and Cotabato City.

Commercial retail centers
The city of Kidapawan boasts the most number of shopping and retail centers in the whole province of Cotabato. Gaisano Grand Mall of Kidapawan, the largest shopping center in the city, is located at Purok 1, Barangay Lanao in the northern part of the city's urban core, while the KMCC Shopping Center is located at Dayao St., deep into the city's main thoroughfare. Other retail centers include Davao Central Warehouse Club Inc. located in National Highway, and Survive Marketing and Sugni Superstore both located at Quezon Boulevard.

Agriculture
Kidapawan is home to the Dole-Stanfilco Banana Plantation and Palletizing Facility, which is under the management of Dole Philippines, itself a subsidiary of the American food producer Dole Food Company. The said plantation, which also had its holdings on neighboring towns Makilala and Matalam, is the largest in the province of Cotabato. With this, the city is an international exporter of bananas globally.

Kidapawan is home to a sizeable flower-cutting industry and one of the major sources of income among Kidapaweños. In addition to ornamental and forest tree seedlings, flowers such as roses, anthuriums and orchids are abundantly grown and cultivated locally, providing a very promising and highly profitable source of livelihood and business in the area.

Crops abundantly grown in the city include abaca, rubber, maize, rice, coconut, and vegetables.

Cotabato City-Kidapawan City (CK) Agri-industrial and Eco Tourism Corridor

Is an Agri-industrial and Eco Tourism Corridor projected by the NEDA region 12, the primary growth node in this corridor is Cotabato City with Kidapawan City and Midsayap as intermediate urban centers.

Cotabato City as the primary urban center in this corridor, serves as the institutional, financial and service center, also the center of public health with the existence of the Cotabato Regional and Medical Center, and the de facto capital of BARMM. The city is a special economic zone is expected to diversify its economic base and will facilitate the creation of more investment and job opportunities.

Cotabato Province ranks first in the region in rice and rubber production, second in corn and produces organic coco sugar and delicious tropical fruits. It hosts processing plants for palm oil, sugar cane and rubber. The Mount Apo Geothermal Power plant in Kidapawan City generates 52 megawatts.

Tourism 

Located in Kidapawan is the Paniki Falls Eco-River Park located at Umpan Village, Barangay Balabag. The country's tallest peak is an abode to the almost extinct Philippine eagle. Within the Mt. Apo Natural Park is the Mandarangan Geological Site which is being promoted as a major educational tourism site.

Another tourist destination in this city is Kansal Falls located at Sitio Lapaan in Barangay Perez in the eastern part of the city. The water from the Kansal Falls is the source of North Cotabato's Metro Kidapawan Water District Dam. The water rushing through Kansal Falls comes from the various mountain springs of Mt. Apo. This waterfall is the source of Kidapawan City's water supply.

Events

Often dubbed as the Second Fruit Basket of the Philippines, the city government celebrate the abundance of the exotic fruits grown in Kidapawan City by holding an annual festival in the month of August called Timpupo, the fruit festival. This festival, first held in 2001, celebrates fruit harvest. The city purchases large quantities of local fruit which is laid out on tables along the streets for visitors and residents.

The Foundation Anniversary of the City of Kidapawan is held every August 28 (together with Timpupo), while the city's Charter Day is celebrated on February 12.

Education

Infrastructure

Transportation
Kidapawan is the transportation nexus of the whole eastern Cotabato province. It is the main highway road junction to all of the province's eastern municipalities that were not situated on and was not passed through by the National Highway which passes through the entire east-to-west span of the city. It is also the primary gateway and road junction to the towns of the Arakan Valley, namely President Roxas, Antipas and Arakan.

Quezon Boulevard, the Paco-Arakan-Katipunan Highway, the Kidapawan-Magpet Highway, the Kidapawan-Kalaisan-Calunasan-Bialong-M'lang Highway, and the Kidapawan-Ilomavis-Agco Road are the major thoroughfares of the city.

Local public transportation is primarily served by almost 3,000 motor tricycles known as just "motor". Multicabs and jeepney provide transportation to barangays and nearby municipalities. Tricycles are the primary mode of transportation within the urban and suburban areas of the city.

The Kidapawan City Overland Terminal caters passenger vans and buses that serve the city to certain areas in Soccsksargen area, Bangsamoro and Davao Region. Public utility vans serve multiple destinations outside the city. Mindanao Star, Davao Metro Shuttle and Yellow Bus Line are the bus companies operating in the city, serving the city with destinations towards the cities of Cotabato, Davao, General Santos, Digos and Tacurong.

Kidapawan has no existing airport of its own and thus relies on nearby airports for its air transport.

Utility
Metro Kidapawan Water District is the main water service provider in the city, while Cotabato Electric Cooperative (Cotelco) delivers electric services into the city. The Mount Apo Geothermal Power Plant, one of the only three geothermal power plants in the Philippines, is located on Barangay Ilomavis in the hilly and geologically active northeastern part of the city.

Telecommunications
Metro Kidapawan Telephone Corporation is the main telephone and telecommunications company operating in Kidapawan. It is operated by the Philippine Long Distance Telephone Company since 2015. Bayantel is the other telephone and telecommunications company operating in the city.

Notable incidents
Identified by the Armed Forces of the Philippines Western Mindanao Command as conflict-affected area which has the presence of CPP-NPA and BIFF, the list below are the recent incidents happened in the city.

Road side blast  Improvise Explosive Device (IED) bomb burst along the national highway in Barangay Marbel, leaving three cops wounded around 2 p.m of May 26, 2017. New Peoples’ Army (NPA) Guerilla Front 53 was behind the said attacks.
The 2017 Kidapawan jail siege occurred when about a hundred unidentified armed men attacked the North Cotabato Provincial Jail in Kidapawan, Philippines at around midnight freeing at least 158 inmates. Five inmates, a barangay official and a prison guard died in the siege. The jail break resulting from the attack is reportedly the biggest in the history of North Cotabato.
2016 Kidapawan protests - For three days from March 30, 2016, thousands of farmers and their supporters blockaded the Davao-Cotabato Highway in Kidapawan, North Cotabato. A day before prior to the road blockade, 500 farmers protest in front of the National Food Authority Office in Kidapawan to air their grievances. The demonstration ended violently with at least three deaths on the side of the protesters and 116 injured on both sides after the police dispersed the mass action.

Healthcare
Kidapawan Medical Specialist Center
Kidapawan Doctors Hospital Inc.
Madonna Medical Center Inc.

References

External links

  Kidapawan Profile at the DTI Cities and Municipalities Competitive Index
[ Philippine Standard Geographic Code]

 
Cities in Soccsksargen
Provincial capitals of the Philippines
Populated places in Cotabato
Populated places established in 1947
1947 establishments in the Philippines
Component cities in the Philippines